"That Beats My Patience" is a non-charted song by British group Freeez from album "Idle Vice", released by Beggars Banquet Records.

Track listing

UK & French single
 A "That Beats My Patience" - 5:50
 B "All The Way", "Tell Me What To Do" - 11:08

Credits
Produced by Mark Berry (tracks no. 2, 3), Peter Wilson (track no. 1)
Remixed by Peter Wilson (track no. 3)

References

See also
Freeez

1985 singles
Freeez songs
1985 songs
Beggars Banquet Records singles